Thomas Patrick Eveld (born December 30, 1993) is an American professional baseball pitcher in the Cincinnati Reds organization.

Professional career

Arizona Diamondbacks
Eveld attended Jesuit High School in Tampa, Florida. He played baseball and American football at Jesuit, giving up baseball to focus on football after the 10th grade. Without a scholarship offer from an NCAA Division I school, he accepted an offer from the University of South Florida to attempt to walk on to the South Florida Bulls football team as a quarterback. He made the Bulls as a wide receiver, but tore his anterior cruciate ligament (ACL) in 2014, requiring surgery. He joined the South Florida Bulls baseball team in 2015. He was later diagnosed with a re-tear of the ACL, and had a second surgery.

The Arizona Diamondbacks selected Eveld in the ninth round, with 269th overall selection, of the 2016 MLB draft. He made his professional debut that year with the Hillsboro Hops, going 2-1 with a 1.86 ERA in 29 relief innings pitched. In 2017, he had an 0.33 ERA and 14 saves for the Kane County Cougars before earning a midseason promotion to the Visalia Rawhide. In 19 relief appearances for Visalia, he was 0-5 with a 5.73 ERA. He began the 2018 season with Visalia and was promoted to the Jackson Generals in July.

Miami Marlins
On July 31, 2018, Eveld was traded to the Miami Marlins in exchange for Brad Ziegler. He was assigned to the Jacksonville Jumbo Shrimp and finished the year there. In 45 relief appearances between Visalia, Jackson, and Jacksonville, he was 4-3 with a 1.07 ERA and a 0.93 WHIP. In 2019, Eveld split the year between Double-A Jacksonville and the Triple-A New Orleans Baby Cakes, posting a cumulative 5.11 ERA in 42 appearances. Eveld did not play in a game in 2020 due to the cancellation of the minor league season because of the COVID-19 pandemic. Eveld split the 2021 season between Jacksonville and the Single-A Jupiter Hammerheads, logging a 3.33 ERA with 59 strikeouts in 38 games between the two teams. 

Eveld spent the majority of 2022 with Triple-A Jacksonville. In 23 games, he posted a 1-2 record and 3.38 ERA with 31 strikeouts in 34.2 innings pitched. He elected free agency on November 10, 2022.

Cincinnati Reds
On February 10, 2023, Eveld signed a minor league contract with the Cincinnati Reds organization.

Personal life
Eveld has two brothers, Bobby and Wesley, and one sister, Tiffany. Bobby and Wesley played baseball for Jesuit and South Florida, while Bobby also played for their football teams. Eveld's fiancé, Erica, played for the South Florida Bulls softball team.

References

External links

1993 births
Living people
Sportspeople from Coral Springs, Florida
Baseball players from Florida
Baseball pitchers
South Florida Bulls baseball players
South Florida Bulls football players
Hillsboro Hops players
Kane County Cougars players
Visalia Rawhide players
Jackson Generals (Southern League) players
Jacksonville Jumbo Shrimp players
Salt River Rafters players
New Orleans Baby Cakes players
Jesuit High School (Tampa) alumni